Alexandre de Moraes (born 13 December 1968 in São Paulo) is a Brazilian jurist, currently serving as president of the Superior Electoral Court and as a justice of the Supreme Federal Court.

De Moraes was appointed to the Supreme Court by President Michel Temer in 2017 when serving as Minister of Justice and Public Security.  Previously Justice Moraes acted as Secretary for Public Security in the State of São Paulo and had been a member of the Brazilian Public Prosecutor's Office.  De Moraes's presidency of Brazil's Superior Electoral Court and certain actions he took during the 2022 Brazilian general election has made him the target of allegations and criticisms by former President Jair Bolsonaro and his supporters.  After the 2023 Brazilian Congress attack, de Moraes ordered several judicial actions to maintain Brazil's democratic rule.

Life
Married with three children, Alexandre de Moraes studied at the Law Faculty of the University of São Paulo, graduating in 1990.

De Moraes is an associate professor of the Law School, University of São Paulo (USP). He received a doctorate in State Law from the same university under the supervision of professor Dalmo Dallari, with a thesis about constitutional jurisdiction.

He was a member of the Brazilian Social Democracy Party (PSDB). In 2002, he was appointed Secretary of Public Security of the State of São Paulo.

Alexandre de Moraes has been involved in several corruption related scandals, Alexandre de Moraes is suspected of receiving $4 million  from a company that was part of the nation's largest graft scheme involving the Workers' Party (Partido dos Trabalhadores - PT) investigated by the Federal Police. Despite several corruption allegations and controversies De Moraes was nominated minister of the Supreme Federal Court by president Michel Temer on 22 February 2017, succeeding minister Teori Zavascki, who was killed on 19 January 2017 in a plane crash, while overseeing the investigation of politicians linked to the nation's largest graft scheme.

Alexandre de Moraes assumed office on 22 March 2017. As minister, he claims to defend a policy of "zero tolerance". He denounced the alleged "criminal attitudes" of leftist movements and justified police violence. He was at the centre of another controversy when the Brazilian newspaper Estadão published an investigation claiming that he had intervened to defend the Transcooper cooperative, suspected of being linked to Brazil's main drug trafficking group, the First Command of the Capital (PCC), which he denied.

On 10 June 2020, de Moraes – in response to a legal challenge from three political parties – said the health ministry must "fully re-establish the daily divulgation of epidemiological data on the Covid-19 pandemic", including on its website: «Mr Moraes gave President Jair Bolsonaro's government 48 hours to release the full figures again».

On 16 August 2022, de Moraes was elected as the presiding justice of the Superior Electoral Court, in a public ceremony with 2000 guests at the court auditorium. The justice Ricardo Lewandowski took place as his vice-president on duty.

2020 Brazil Judiciary fake news inquiry 
In April 2019, the Supreme Federal Court president Dias Toffoli, a former legal representative for the Workers' Party (PT) in the presidential campaigns of Luiz Inácio Lula da Silva in 1998, 2002 and 2006, launched an inquiry to investigate personal attacks and statements  against court members. Moraes was chosen as its rapporteur. That month, Crusoé magazine reported that a document from Operation Car Wash revealed that then-Solicitor General Toffoli was also involved in the Odebrecht scandal, lead by the  Workers' Party (PT) and involving former president Luiz Inácio Lula da Silva, according to the company's former chairman Marcelo Odebrecht.

On 15 April, de Moraes ordered that Crusoé take down the article from their website. Toffoli himself later requested a probe into whether Crusoé illegally leaked the document. The Court's decision on the matter was criticized by outlets such as The Intercept on the basis of censorship and attack on the freedom of the press.

On 27 May 2020, as part of that same inquiry, the Federal Police launched an operation probing businessmen, bloggers and politicians allied to President Jair Bolsonaro.

Several politicians (liberals and conservatives), private sector, civil society members and medias accused de Moraes of practicing nepotism, political interference, of political repression, abusing of power and deploying a constitutional dictatorship.

On 19 March 2022, de Moraes ordered the suspension of the messaging app Telegram, accusing it of repeatedly failing to block accounts spreading disinformation, and ignoring previous court decisions. President Bolsonaro called the ruling "inadmissible", while Telegram founder Pavel Durov blamed the company's failings on email issues, pledging to do a better job.

Notes

See also
 List of scandals in Brazil

References

|-

|-

|-

|-

|-

|-

1968 births
Living people
Ministers of Justice of Brazil
20th-century Brazilian lawyers
People from São Paulo
Primeiro Comando da Capital
Supreme Federal Court of Brazil justices
21st-century Brazilian judges